Alphamenes richardsi is a species of wasp in the family Vespidae. It was described by Soika in 1978.

References

Vespidae
Insects described in 1978